East Knox High School (EKHS) is a public high school in Howard, Ohio, United States. It is part of the East Knox Local Schools district.

References

External links 
 

High schools in Knox County, Ohio
Public high schools in Ohio